Puccinia carthami is a plant pathogen that causes rust on safflower.

See also
 List of Puccinia species

References

External links
 USDA ARS Fungal Database

Fungal plant pathogens and diseases
carthami
Fungi described in 1840
Taxa named by August Carl Joseph Corda